is a professional Japanese baseball player. He plays catcher for the Hiroshima Toyo Carp.

References 

1992 births
Living people
Baseball people from Aichi Prefecture
Japanese baseball players
Nippon Professional Baseball catchers
Hiroshima Toyo Carp players
People from Toyota, Aichi